Coffee in Sumatra may refer to:
 Coffee production in Sumatra
 Coffee consumption in Indonesia